Shahriston District (Nohiyai Shahriston) is a district in Sughd Region, Tajikistan. Its capital is Shahriston. The population of the district is 43,700 (January 2020 estimate).

Administrative divisions
They are as follows:

Artefact

References

Districts of Tajikistan
Sughd Region